On 3 July 2022, a man opened fire at the Field's shopping mall in Copenhagen, Denmark, killing three people and critically wounding four others. A suspect, a Danish man, was arrested after the shooting; he had a history of contact with the psychiatric healthcare system. According to police, there are no indications that the shooting was terrorism. The suspect has been charged with three murders and seven attempted murders. The mass shooting is the first in Denmark since the 2015 Copenhagen shootings.

Shooting
Police received the first shooting reports at 17:37 at the Field's shopping mall located in Ørestad, a developing city area on Amager in Copenhagen. A man carrying a rifle and a knifewhich was not used in the attackhad entered the mall sometime before 17:30.  A witness said the shooter seemed violent and angry, running and shouting. When directly addressed by the witness, the shooter said that "it is not real". The rifle caliber has been speculated as either 6.5×55mm or .308 Winchester/7.62×51mm.

According to police, the victims appear to have been random, with no indication that any particular group was targeted. The suspect was arrested by police eleven minutes after the shooting had been reported.

Victims
Three people were killed, and four more were seriously wounded by gunfire. The dead are a 17-year-old Danish girl, a 17-year-old Danish boy and a 47-year-old Russian man who was living in Denmark. 

Another 23 people received minor injuries, including three whose injuries were from stray gunfire, with the additional twenty individuals injured in the evacuation. The four seriously wounded victims are two Swedish citizens and two Danes.

Accused
A 22-year-old Danish man was arrested in connection with the shooting. He had a history of contact with the psychiatric healthcare system. Shortly before the shooting he uploaded videos to social media where he simulated suicide with the rifle and a gun and said that a specific type of psychiatric medication did not work. The firearms he used during the shooting and posed with in the videos were not owned by him and he did not have the required firearms licence. They were legally owned by a person who was a member of a sport shooting club and was living in the same home as the shooter. In the videos posted by the shooter before the attack, a gun safe can be seen.

The accused has been charged with three murders and seven attempted murders. At a court hearing on 4 July 2022, he was remanded to a closed psychiatric unit. Prior to starting the hearing, the judge asked the media to leave the court room and held the hearing behind closed doors, with the accused remaining in custody until 28 July. The court has banned the release of both the suspect's and the victims' names.

Aftermath
A temporary crisis center where people could receive psychiatric help was opened after the shooting.

Shortly after the shooting, the Danish royal family announced that a reception due to be hosted by Crown Prince Frederik to celebrate Denmark hosting the 2022 Tour de France had been cancelled. British singer Harry Styles cancelled a concert at the nearby Royal Arena scheduled later that evening.

A memorial held on 5 July 2022 at the Field's shopping mall was attended by thousands of people, the Prime Minister of Denmark Mette Frederiksen, Lord Mayor of Copenhagen Sophie Hæstorp Andersen, other senior political figures as well as Crown Prince Frederik and Prince Christian of Denmark. An additional tribute to the victims, in the form of a minute's silence, was observed at the Tour de France before the start of the fourth stage of the race on 5 July.

Response
Prime minister Frederiksen described the attack as cruel, said that she had the deepest sympathy with the victims and their families, and thanked the police and first aiders.

Lauren Boebert, an American congresswoman, was criticized for claiming that "gun laws [do not stop] mass shootings" while referring to the shooting.

References

Mall shooting
2022 crimes in Denmark
2022 mass shootings in Europe
July 2022 events in Denmark
July 2022 crimes in Europe
Attacks on shopping malls
Mall shooting
Deaths by firearm in Denmark
Violence in Denmark
Amager